List of champions of the 1908 U.S. National Championships tennis tournament (now known as the US Open). The men's tournament was held from 18 August to 29 August on the outdoor grass courts at the Newport Casino in Newport, Rhode Island. The women's tournament was held from 22 June to 27 June on the outdoor grass courts at the Philadelphia Cricket Club in Philadelphia, Pennsylvania. It was the 28th U.S. National Championships and the second Grand Slam tournament of the three played that year.

Finals

Men's singles

 William Larned (USA) defeated  Beals Wright (USA) 6–1, 6–2, 8–6

Women's singles

 Maud Barger-Wallach (USA) defeated  Evelyn Sears (USA) 6–3, 1–6, 6–3

Men's doubles
 Fred Alexander (USA) /  Harold Hackett (USA) defeated  Raymond Little (USA) /  Beals Wright (USA) 6–1, 7–5, 6–2

Women's doubles
 Evelyn Sears (USA) /  Margaret Curtis (USA) defeated  Carrie Neely (USA) /  Miriam Steever (USA) 6–3, 5–7, 9–7

Mixed doubles
 Edith Rotch (USA) /  Nathaniel Niles (USA) defeated  Louise Hammond Raymond (USA) /  Raymond Little (USA) 6–4, 4–6, 6–4

References

External links
 Official US Open website

 
U.S. National Championships
U.S. National Championships (tennis) by year
U.S. National Championships
U.S. National Championships (tennis)
U.S. National Championships (tennis)
U.S. National Championships (tennis)
U.S. National Championships (tennis)